The year 1704 in architecture involved some significant events.

Buildings and structures

Buildings
 English architect and dramatist John Vanbrugh is commissioned to begin Blenheim Palace.
 Schleissheim Palace near Munich in Bavaria, designed by Enrico Zuccalli, is completed.
 Cound Hall, Shropshire, England, designed by John Prince or Price, is completed.
 Burgh House, Hampstead, London is built.
 Church of the Ascension, Hall Green, Birmingham, England, probably designed by Sir William Wilson, is consecrated.
 Construction of Hirado Castle in Nagasaki (Japan) begins.
 Construction on Ludwigsburg Palace begins.

Births
 March 6 (bapt.) – Isaac Ware, English architect (died 1766)
 August 26 (bapt.) – John Wood, the Elder, English architect working in Bath (died 1754)

Deaths
 Paolo Falconieri, Florentine architect, painter and mathematician (born 1638)

References

architecture
Years in architecture
18th-century architecture